Sophie Moss (Zofia Roza Maria Jadwiga Elzbieta Katarzyna Aniela Tarnowska, 16 March 1917 - 22 November 2009) was a Polish noblewoman and World War II organiser. At the request of General Władysław Sikorski, Poland's wartime leader, she ended up at the Cairo branch of the Polish Red Cross.

Early life

Moss was born during the First World War, near Tarnobrzeg, a town in South-eastern Poland which her Tarnowski family founded in 1593.

She was the daughter of Hieronim, a politician and a writer. Her grandfather was Count Stanislaw Tarnowski (1837–1917), who was a professor and rector at the Jagiellonian University in Krakow. His home, also known as the Szlak, had been the resting place of deceased Polish kings on the night before the kings' burial at Wawel. Moss was also a possible direct descendant of Catherine the Great of Russia  and her family had held some of the highest offices in Poland.

In 1937, she married Andrew Tarnowski, a member of the senior branch of the family. Her first son was under two when he died in July 1939.

World War II

Invasion
At the outbreak of war, Tarnowska and her husband left their home to find the front where Poland was fighting against the Germans. She burnt her passport as a gesture of commitment to never leaving Polish soil. Tarnowska and her companions, including her brother Stanislaw, were determined to join Polish front-line troops confronting the German onslaught. After spending a fortnight crisscrossing Poland by car, they finally resigned to cross the still open border into Romania, reaching Bucharest as the Soviet invasion progressed from the East. As sympathy for the Nazi cause grew in Bucharest, they decided to leave and head for Belgrade, where they were welcomed by the Serbs. They traveled through the Balkans, where their second baby son died. They traveled on, stopping in British-occupied Palestine, where their marriage broke down.

Separated from her husband, Tarnowska left Palestine and traveled to Cairo, where she and her sister-in-law were looked after by Prince Youssef Kamal ed-Dine (a visitor to Poland before the War). She began working for the International Red Cross tracing missing Allied soldiers. General Sikorski, the Polish Prime Minister-in-Exile and Commander-in-Chief, visited Cairo in November 1941. At his request, Tarnowska set up the Cairo branch of the Polish Red Cross with the help of Lady Lampson, wife of Sir Miles Lampson, the British Ambassador, and Sir Duncan Mackenzie of the British Red Cross. She became friends with King Farouk and Queen Farida.

Tarnowska was living at the National Hotel as Rommel advanced into Egypt in June 1942 after the fall of Tobruk. Cairo was evacuated, and many of her contemporaries left for Palestine, but she refused to leave and carried on working for the Polish Red Cross until she was ordered to leave for Palestine by the Polish Legation. She refused and instead set off defiantly for the front, to Alexandria, to be near the troops close to the site of the First Battle of El Alamein. There she stayed in a hotel as the only guest, all others having fled. As Rommel's advance was halted, Tarnowska returned to Cairo in July 1942 to welcome the returning evacuees.

Tara

Tarnowska's journeys in North Africa feature prominently in a book on the history of the period. In 1943 Tarnowska moved into a squatted villa on Gezira Island found by Capt Bill Stanley Moss, with a group of British SOE officers who included:
 Capt Bill Stanley Moss
 Xan Fielding
 Arnold Breene
 Patrick Leigh Fermor
 Billy McLean
 David Smiley
 Rowland Winn

The villa was dubbed Tara by its occupants – after Hill of Tara, mythical home of the High Kings of Ireland. It became a centre for entertaining diplomats, officers, writers, lecturers, war correspondents and local party-goers, hosted by Tarnowska, in the guise of "Princess Dneiper-Petrovsk" with:
 Lt-Col. Neil (Billy) McLean as "Sir Eustace Rapier"  
 Col. David Smiley as "the Marquis of Whipstock"  
 Rowland Winn as "the Hon, Rupert Sabretache"
 Major Xan Fielding as "Lord Hughe Devildrive" 
 Arnold Breene as "Lord Pintpot"  
 Lt-Col Patrick Leigh-Fermor as "Lord Rakehell"
 Capt. W. Stanley Moss as "Mr Jack Jargon"

Tarnowska drew on memories of liqueur-making on her father's estates to produce the party drinks. By the winter of 1944 the owner of the damaged property secured the eviction of the occupants who moved into a flat.

Family

In 1945, she married W. Stanley Moss. He had fought with the 8th Army in the North African Campaign before joining the Special Operations Executive based in Cairo. He is best remembered for the capture and Abduction to Egypt, in April and May 1944, of General Heinrich Kreipe. He became a best-selling author in the 1950s.

They had three children, Christine Isabelle Mercedes, named after their mutual friend and former SOE agent Krystyna Skarbek (Christine Granville), Sebastian (who died in infancy), and Gabriella Zofia. Initially living in London, they moved to Riverstown House, County Cork in Ireland. They later returned to London, Putney, but separated in 1957. Moss died in 1965 in Kingston, Jamaica.

Historic visit to Poland

When Tarnowska left her father's home at Rudnik at the outbreak of war in 1939, he gave her for safe-keeping the personal seventeenth-century jack, the "proporzec", of King Karl Gustav of Sweden, a trophy won at his army's famous defeat on the Tarnowski estate during the Deluge. In 1957, she and her brother, Stanislaw also living in London, decided to donate the historic flag to the Wawel Art Collection in Krakow, where it remains. The Communist government highlighted the cultural event, and granted the visiting party visas, but Tarnowska declined all offers of expenses-paid travel and hospitality. Sister and brother paid their own expenses and were allowed to revisit Rudnik.

After the fall of communism, Tarnowska's nephew was eventually able to buy back Rudnik - sadly dilapidated and gradually restored. She and her brother were later able to host several family gatherings on the estate in Poland.

Later years
For much of the latter part of her life, she divided her time between London and spending her summer months returning to Ireland.

Literature
   My father joins the fire brigade Bruno Schulz, transl. by W. Stanley Moss and Zofia Tarnowska Moss

References

1917 births
2009 deaths
Polish humanitarians
Women humanitarians
Tarnowski family
People from Nisko County